The Norwegian National Golf Championship is an annual golf tournament, played at various locations throughout Norway. It is organized by the Norwegian Golf Federation and was first played in 1956. The championship has been played as a 72-hole stroke-play event since 1968. Previously it was played as a match-play tournament.

Since 1970 (men) and 1976 (women) the winner receives the Kongepokal, the King's Trophy, from Norwegian Olympic and Paralympic Committee and Confederation of Sports in recognition of their status as Norwegian champion.

Currently, the tournament is open to both amateur and professional golfers, Norwegian citizens as well as foreign residents of Norway provided they have resided in Norway for a minimum period of one year prior to tournament start.

Winners

Source:

Multiple winners

Women

Men

References

External links
Norwegian Golf Federation: Norwegian National Golf Championship
Norwegian Golf Federation: Past winners – Men
Norwegian Golf Federation: Past winners – Women

Golf tournaments in Norway
Summer events in Norway